Pomelsee is a lake in Mecklenburgische Seenplatte, Mecklenburgische Seenplatte, Mecklenburg-Vorpommern, Germany. At an elevation of 55.8 m, its surface area is 0.15 km2.

Lakes of Mecklenburg-Western Pomerania